West Yorkshire is a metropolitan and ceremonial county in the Yorkshire and the Humber region of England. It is an inland and upland county having eastward-draining valleys while taking in the moors of the Pennines. West Yorkshire came into existence as a metropolitan county in 1974 after the reorganisation of the Local Government Act 1972 which saw it formed from a large part of the West Riding of Yorkshire. The county had a population of 2.3 million in the 2011 census making it the fourth-largest by population in England. The largest towns are Huddersfield, Castleford, Batley, Bingley, Pontefract, Halifax, Brighouse, Keighley, Pudsey, Morley and Dewsbury. The three cities of West Yorkshire are Bradford, Leeds and Wakefield.

West Yorkshire consists of five metropolitan boroughs (City of Bradford, Calderdale, Kirklees, City of Leeds and City of Wakefield); it is bordered by the counties of Derbyshire to the south, Greater Manchester to the south-west, Lancashire to the west and north-west, North Yorkshire to the north and east, South Yorkshire to the south and south-east.

Remnants of strong coal, wool and iron ore industries remain in the county, having attracted people over the centuries, and this can be seen in the buildings and architecture. Quite a few railways and the M1, M621, M606, A1(M) and M62 motorways traverse the county.

West Yorkshire includes the West Yorkshire Built-up Area, which is the biggest and most built-up urban area within the historic county boundaries of Yorkshire.

Governance

West Yorkshire County Council was abolished in 1986, so its five districts became effectively unitary authorities.

Since 1 April 2014, West Yorkshire has been a combined authority area, with the local authorities pooling together some functions over transport and regeneration as the West Yorkshire Combined Authority. The first Mayor of West Yorkshire, Tracy Brabin, was elected on 6 May 2021, following a devolution deal announced by the government in the March 2020 budget.

The conurbation of Bradford, Dewsbury, Halifax, Huddersfield, Leeds and  Wakefield makes up the West Yorkshire Built-up Area, which is the fourth-largest in the United Kingdom and the largest within the historic county boundaries of Yorkshire.

In Parliament, 13 out of 22 of West Yorkshire's MPs are Labour and 9 are Conservative. At local level, the councils are generally divided, apart from the Wakefield district, which has long been one of the safest Labour councils in the country.

Certain services are provided across the county by West Yorkshire Joint Services, and the West Yorkshire Police and West Yorkshire Fire and Rescue Service are also county-wide.

Geography

The county borders, going anticlockwise from the west: Lancashire, Greater Manchester, Derbyshire, South Yorkshire and North Yorkshire. The terrain of the county mostly consists of the Pennines and its foothills which dominate the west of the county and gradually descend into the Vale of York and Humberhead Levels in the east. Geologically, it lies almost entirely on rocks of carboniferous age which form the inner Southern Pennine fringes in the west and the Yorkshire coalfield further eastwards. In the extreme east of the metropolitan county there are younger deposits of Magnesian Limestone. Areas in the west such as Bradford and Calderdale are dominated by the scenery of the eastern slopes of the South Pennines, dropping from upland in the west down to the east, and dissected by many steep-sided valleys while a small part of the northern Peak District extends into the south west of Kirklees. Large-scale industry, housing, public and commercial buildings of differing heights, transport routes and open countryside conjoin. The dense network of roads, canals and railways and urban development, confined by valleys creates dramatic interplay of views between settlements and the surrounding hillsides, as shaped the first urban-rural juxtapositions of David Hockney. Where most rural the land crops up in the such rhymes and folklore as On Ilkla Moor Baht 'at, date unknown, the early 19th century novels and poems of the Brontë family often in and around Haworth and long-running light comedy-drama Last of the Summer Wine in the 20th century.

The carboniferous rocks of the Yorkshire coalfield further east have produced a rolling landscape with hills, escarpments and broad valleys in the outer fringes of the Pennines. In this landscape there is widespread evidence of both current and former industrial activity. There are numerous derelict or converted mine buildings and recently landscaped former spoil heaps. The scenery is a mixture of built up areas, industrial land with some dereliction, and farmed open country. Ribbon developments along transport routes including canal, road and rail are prominent features of the area although some remnants of the pre industrial landscape and semi-natural vegetation still survive. However, many areas are affected by urban fringe pressures creating fragmented and downgraded landscapes and ever present are urban influences from major cities, smaller industrial towns and former mining villages. In the Magnesian Limestone belt to the east of the Leeds and Wakefield areas is an elevated ridge with smoothly rolling scenery, dissected by dry valleys. Here, there is a large number of country houses and estates with parkland, estate woodlands, plantations and game coverts.

The rivers Aire and Calder drain the area, flowing from west to east.

The table below outlines many of the county's settlements, and is formatted according to their metropolitan borough.

All of these form part of the former West Riding of Yorkshire. A portion of Derbyshire borders West and South Yorkshire at Glossop and Woodhead.

A small section of West Yorkshire forms scattered settlements into Rochdale in Greater Manchester with the villages of Walsden and Rishworth in Calderdale which are only 8 and 11 miles apart from the main town centre. West Yorkshire also has close ties with Lancashire in terms of history, local identity and infrastructure including with the War of the Roses and Lancashire and Yorkshire Railway. Up until the 19th century, the town of Todmorden was in Lancashire but was moved into Yorkshire. In the 1974 boundary review. The towns of Earby and Barnoldswick were moved into the Pendle district of Lancashire. The towns of Halifax, Hebden Bridge, Keighley and the city of Bradford border the boroughs of Pendle, Burnley and Rossendale. The civil parish of Saddleworth in Oldham was the only part of West Riding of Yorkshire to be moved into the county of Greater Manchester. The villages in the parish border the towns of Huddersfield and Holmfirth. There is a strong identity debate with Saddleworth residents who still maintain close connections with Yorkshire. Including the Saddleworth White Rose Society.

History

West Yorkshire was formed as a metropolitan county in 1974, by the Local Government Act 1972, and corresponds roughly to the core of the historic West Riding of Yorkshire and the county boroughs of Bradford, Dewsbury, Halifax, Huddersfield, Leeds, and Wakefield.

West Yorkshire Metropolitan County Council inherited the use of West Riding County Hall at Wakefield, opened in 1898, from the West Riding County Council in 1974. Since 1987 it has been the headquarters of Wakefield City Council.

The county initially had a two-tier structure of local government with a strategic-level county council and five districts providing most services. In 1986, throughout England the metropolitan county councils were abolished. The functions of the county council were devolved to the boroughs; joint-boards covering fire, police and public transport; and to other special joint arrangements. Organisations such as the West Yorkshire Police (governed by the West Yorkshire Police and Crime Commissioner) continue to operate on this basis.

Although the county council was abolished, West Yorkshire continues to form a metropolitan and ceremonial county with a Lord Lieutenant of West Yorkshire and a High Sheriff.

Wakefield's Parish Church was raised to cathedral status in 1888 and after the elevation of Wakefield to diocese, Wakefield Council immediately sought city status and this was granted in July 1888. However the industrial revolution, which changed West and South Yorkshire significantly, led to the growth of Leeds and Bradford, which became the area's two largest cities (Leeds being the largest in Yorkshire). Leeds was granted city status in 1893 and Bradford in 1897. The name of Leeds Town Hall reflects the fact that at its opening in 1858 Leeds was not yet a city, while Bradford renamed its Town Hall as City Hall in 1965.

Green belt

West Yorkshire contains green belt interspersed throughout the county, surrounding the West Yorkshire Urban Area. It was first drawn up in the 1950s. All the county's districts contain large portions of green belt.

Demography

Economy

Industries
Leeds has since attracted investment from financial institutions, to become a recognised financial centre, with many banks, building societies and insurance companies having offices in the city.  Wakefield has also attracted many service-based industries, in particular call centres. Two of the big four supermarkets are from West Yorkshire. Morrisons is based in Bradford, while Asda is based in Leeds.

West Yorkshire grew up around several industries. Wakefield, Castleford, Pontefract and South and East Leeds were traditional coal mining areas.

Wool
Bradford, Halifax and Huddersfield grew through the development of woollen mills. Leeds' traditional industry was the manufacturing of cloth while heavier engineering industries facilitated growth in South Leeds.

The Heavy Woollen District covered towns such as Dewsbury, Batley, Morley, Ossett, Cleckheaton and Heckmondwike. The woollen and cloth industries declined throughout the twentieth century.

Rhubarb
The Rhubarb Triangle is wholly in West Yorkshire and still produces the vegetable in considerable quantities. Twelve farmers who farm within the Rhubarb Triangle applied to have the name "Yorkshire forced rhubarb" added to the list of foods and drinks that have their names legally protected by the European Commission's Protected Food Name scheme. The application was successful and the farmers in the Rhubarb Triangle were awarded Protected Designation of Origin status (PDO) in February 2010. Food protected status accesses European funding to promote the product and legal backing against other products made outside the area using the name. Other protected names include Stilton cheese, Champagne and Parma Ham.

Coal
Many of the coal mines in West Yorkshire closed during the Robens era in the 1960s, but mining was still a significant employer in the Wakefield district at the time of the 1984–85 strike. The last pit in West Yorkshire to close was Hay Royds Colliery at Denby Dale in 2012 after a flood.

Film and television productions

Several films and television series have been filmed in West Yorkshire's historic areas, particularly around the town of Halifax. For example, portions of the BBC television series Happy Valley were filmed in Huddersfield; in addition to exteriors, some of the studio filming was done at North Light Film Studios at Brookes Mill, Huddersfield. As well, interiors for the BBC's Jamaica Inn, for the BBC's Remember Me and for ITV series Black Work, were also filmed at the studios. More recently, many of the exteriors of the BBC series Jericho were filmed at the nearby Rockingstone Quarry and some interior work was done at North Light Film Studios.

Tourism

Urban tourism varies. National interest features include sporting stadia, museums, theatre and galleries. Royal Armouries is in Leeds, as is the Leeds Playhouse (formerly the West Yorkshire Playhouse), Opera North and The Grand Theatre. The First Direct Arena in Leeds seats around 15,000 people. Sheffield Arena is also popular, as is the Bradford Alhambra, St Georges Hall and the Media and Science Museum in Bradford. Leeds is the most popular shopping destination in West Yorkshire, probably Yorkshire and rivals Manchester having claim to Briggate, the Headrow, Trinity Leeds, Victoria Gate, the Victoria and Northern Quarters, the biggest indoor market in Europe and the White Rose Centre, as well as many 'first outside of London' labels such as Harvey Nichols and Victoria's Secret. Leeds is also a popular nightlife destination domestically, which is not surprising given its accessibility and central location. All cities are well connected via rail and road, Leeds railway station is an important hub seeing 29.7 million passengers 2015–16, making it the fourth busiest station in the UK after London stations, Birmingham New Street and Glasgow Central. It is the busiest in Northern England.

Signposted walks follow rivers and the escarpment of the Pennines, which is scaled in meandering stages and tunnels by the recreational Leeds-Liverpool Canal and Rochdale Canal, navigable by barge, canoe or kayak.  Other tourism features include abbeys, castles, countryside walks, landscapes, picturesque villages, architecture, stately homes, tea rooms, real ale breweries, farmer's markets, restaurants and hiking in villages including Hebden Bridge, Ilkley with its scenic riversides, cherry blossoms and suspension bridge and equally in Wharfedale, Otley.

Transport

West Yorkshire lies in arguably the most strategic part of Yorkshire: the M62, M1 and the A1(M) pass through the county, as well as the internal urban motorways in Leeds and Bradford. West Yorkshire has two mainline railway stations, Leeds and Wakefield Westgate. Leeds railway station is the only Network Rail principal station in Yorkshire and North East England, and one of only three in the North of England along with Manchester Piccadilly and Liverpool Lime Street. Other important railway stations in West Yorkshire include Bradford Interchange, Bradford Forster Square, Huddersfield, Halifax, Dewsbury, Keighley and Shipley. West Yorkshire also has Yorkshire's largest airport, Leeds Bradford Airport.

Unlike South Yorkshire, West Yorkshire has no light transit system; the Leeds Supertram was proposed but was later cancelled after the withdrawal of government funding. Public transport is run under the authority of West Yorkshire Metro.

In October 2021, £830 million of funding was announced for the West Yorkshire Combined Authority to develop mass transit for the region.

Additionally, the West Yorkshire Combined Authority won its bids for the Zero Emission Bus Regional Areas (ZEBRA) scheme and Bus Service Improvement Plan (BSIP) scheme, the successful ZEBRA funding will see the introduction of between 179 and 245 zero-emission electric buses with the necessary infrastructure whilst the BSIP plan will give the West Yorkshire Combined Authority £70 million out of a desired £168 million to implement the improvements outlined in the authority's BSIP.

Sport

Major football clubs in West Yorkshire include Leeds United, Huddersfield Town, and Bradford City.

Rugby league is also big in West Yorkshire. The teams who are, or have been, in the Super League are Bradford Bulls, Castleford Tigers, Halifax Panthers, Huddersfield Giants, Leeds Rhinos, and Wakefield Trinity. Other rugby league clubs in West Yorkshire include Batley Bulldogs, Dewsbury Rams, Featherstone Rovers, Hunslet Hawks and Keighley Cougars. Any combination of these teams playing against each other would be called a West Yorkshire derby even if the rivalry is not as great as other rivalries between teams in the area. The main rugby union club in the county is Yorkshire Carnegie.

Elland Road is the largest stadium in the area, hosting Leeds United. The Headingley Stadium, a stadium complex also in Leeds, consists of a cricket and a rugby ground. The cricket ground is home of the Yorkshire County Cricket Club and the rugby ground is home to both Leeds Rhinos and Yorkshire Carnegie. In Huddersfield, the John Smith's Stadium is home to Huddersfield Town and Huddersfield Giants. In Bradford, Valley Parade is the home of Bradford City, whereas the Odsal Stadium is the home of the Bradford Bulls. Other stadiums include Wheldon Road (Castleford), The Shay (Halifax), Belle Vue (Wakefield), Mount Pleasant (Batley), Crown Flatt (Dewsbury), Post Office Road (Featherstone), John Charles Centre for Sport (Hunslet) and Cougar Park (Keighley).

There are two racecourses in West Yorkshire: Pontefract and Wetherby

West Yorkshire also used to host regular speedway meetings, having the Halifax Dukes and the Bradford Dukes teams. Odsal Stadium used to host BriSCA stock cars. Leeds has a hill climb event at Harewood speed Hillclimb.

Places of interest

Historic environment

Museums

 Abbey House Museum, Leeds
 Armley Mills Industrial Museum, Leeds
 Bagshaw Museum, Batley
 Bankfield Museum, Halifax
 Bradford Industrial Museum, Eccleshill/Fagley, Bradford
 Brontë Parsonage Museum, Haworth
 Colne Valley Museum, Golcar, Huddersfield
 Eureka, Halifax
 Leeds City Museum, Leeds
 National Coal Mining Museum for England Overton, Wakefield
 National Media Museum, Bradford
 Pennine Farm Museum, Ripponden, Halifax
 Pontefract Museum
 Royal Armouries Museum, Leeds
 Thackray Museum, Leeds
 The Hepworth Wakefield
 Thwaite Mills, Leeds
 Tolson Museum, Dalton, Huddersfield
 Wakefield Museum, Wakefield
 West Yorkshire Folk Museum, Shibden Hall, Halifax
 Yorkshire Sculpture Park, West Bretton, Wakefield

Natural environment
 Emley Moor, site of the tallest self-supporting structure in the UK (a TV mast)
 Harewood Estate – Leeds Country Way public footpath runs through the estate, beautiful landscaped gardens and home to Red Kites amongst many other birds
 Ilkley Moor, part of Rombalds Moor
 New Swillington Ings Nature Reserve
 Otley Chevin – extensive wooded parkland on high ground with extensive views North over Wharfedale and South as far as the Peak District
 RSPB Fairburn Ings and St Aidan's – wetland centres for birds
 Seckar Woods LNR, a Local Nature Reserve
 Walton Hall, West Yorkshire, home of naturalist Charles Waterton and the world's first nature reserve

Waterways
 Scammonden Reservoir, Deanhead Reservoir – both in the moors near Ripponden
 River Aire, River Calder, River Hebble, River Spen, River Worth
 Aire and Calder Navigation
 Calder and Hebble Navigation
 Huddersfield Broad Canal
 Huddersfield Narrow Canal, Standedge Tunnel
 Leeds and Liverpool Canal
 Rochdale Canal

See also
 List of Lord Lieutenants of West Yorkshire
 List of High Sheriffs of West Yorkshire
 The Kingdom of Elmet
 West Yorkshire Urban Area
 West Yorkshire Metropolitan Ambulance Service
 West Yorkshire Regiment (The Prince of Wales's Own)
 List of ceremonial counties in England by gross value added

References

Sources

External links

 West Yorkshire Joint Services
 Images of West Yorkshire  at the English Heritage Archive
 

West Yorkshire
Metropolitan counties
Counties of England established in 1974